Arthur Joseph O'Connell (March 29, 1908 – May 18, 1981) was an American stage, film and television actor, who achieved prominence in character roles in the 1950s. He was nominated for the Academy Award for Best Supporting Actor for both Picnic (1955) and Anatomy of a Murder (1959).

Early life
Arthur O'Connell was born to Julia (née Byrne) & Michael O'Connell on March 29, 1908, in Manhattan, New York. His father died when O'Connell was two; he lost his mother when he was 12. He was the youngest of four children.  His siblings were William, Kathleen, and Juliette.  William, the eldest, became a justice of the New York State Supreme Court and died in 1972.

After his father's death, Arthur was sent to live in Flushing, New York with his mother's sister, Mrs. Charles Koetzner, while his sisters moved in with other relatives and William remained with his mother. Arthur attended St John's College for two years. His early jobs included working in the engineering department of New York Edison, as a salesman at R.H. Macy and as a door-to-door salesman of magazines.

Career

Early roles 
O'Connell went into acting in 1929, landing a role in summer stock at the Frankin Stock Company in Dorchester, Massachusetts, playing a role in The Patsy. In 1934 his career was interrupted by a bout of encephalitis, which required a seven-month stay at the Flower Hospital in New York City. He recovered in a sanitarium for the indigent, and for a time was on home relief living in a cheap room, subsisting on "milk, raw eggs and bananas."

He made his legitimate stage debut in the middle 1930s, appearing in various roles in theater and vaudeville in the U.S, and in London. 

O'Connell's had small film roles early in his career. His film debut was as a student in Freshman Year (1938) and he appeared in a small role as a reporter in Citizen Kane (1941). He costarred in two Leon Errol short subjects as Errol's conniving brother-in-law.

He entered the army in 1945 and served in the Signal Corps. After his discharge he was spotted in little theatre by Charles Laughton and joined a travelling Shakesperean company. His film roles remained insubstantial, playing a detective in The Naked City (1948) and a reporter the 1948 film State of the Union.

Picnic and success 

His career breakthrough came on Broadway, where he originated the role of Howard Bevan, the middle-aged swain of a spinsterish schoolteacher in Picnic. He recreated the Bevan role in the 1955 film version, opposite Rosalind Russell as the schoolteacher, earning an Oscar nomination. As a result of his critically praised performance in the stage and film roles, he was heavily in demand, resulting in "six good roles in rapid succession." O'Connell made more money in one year after Picnic than in the preceding 25 years.

After Picnic, he appeared in another Joshua Logan film, Bus Stop, in 1956, as the commonsensical friend of the lead, played by Don Murray. In that same year he appeared in Solid Gold Cadillac, playing a kindly office manager in love with Judy Holliday. His performance as James Stewart's alcoholic mentor in Anatomy of a Murder (1959) resulted in a second Oscar nomination.

He also frequently appeared as a paterfamilias in movies starring teen idols such as Elvis Presley, Pat Boone and Fabian. He frequently played alcoholics, and consulted members of Alcoholics Anonymous in preparation for one of his roles.

In 1959, O'Connell played the part of Chief Petty Officer Sam Tostin, engine room chief of the fictional World War II submarine USS Sea Tiger, opposite Cary Grant and Tony Curtis in Operation Petticoat. In 1961, O'Connell played the role of Grandpa Clarence Beebe in the children's film Misty, the screen adaptation of Marguerite Henry's story Misty of Chincoteague. In 1962, he portrayed the father of Elvis Presley's character in the motion picture Follow That Dream, and in 1964 in the Presley-picture Kissin' Cousins. In the same year, O'Connell portrayed the idealist-turned-antagonist Clint Stark in The 7 Faces of Dr. Lao, which has become a cult classic, and in which O'Connell's is the only character other than star Tony Randall to appear as one of the "7 faces." O'Connell continued appearing in choice character parts on both television and films during the 1960s, but avoided a regular television series, holding out until he could be assured top billing. 

On Christmas Day, 1962, O'Connell was cast as Clayton Dodd in the episode "Green, Green Hills" of the western series Empire, starring Richard Egan as the rancher Jim Redigo. This episode features Dayton Lummis as Jason Simms and Joanna Moore as Althea Dodd. In 1966, he guest-starred as a scientist who regretfully realized that he has created an all-powerful android in an episode of the Voyage to the Bottom of the Sea, titled "The Mechanical Man." In the February 1967 episode "Never Look Back" of the TV series Lassie, he played Luther Jennings, an elderly ranger who monitors the survey tower at Strawberry Peak and who takes it hard when he finds he'll lose his job when the tower is slated for destruction.

In 1967, O'Connell co-starred with Monte Markham in The Second Hundred Years, playing the aging son of a gold miner who was frozen for a hundred years in Alaska. The series lasted for one season.

He worked in commercials, playing a friendly pharmacist as a spokesperson for Crest. He made his final film appearance in The Hiding Place (1975), portraying a Dutch watch-maker who hides Jews during World War II. Alzheimer's Disease forced his retirement in the mid-1970s.

Personal life 
In the late 1950s, O'Connell jointly owned a race horse, April Love, with the singer Pat Boone.

In 1962, O'Connell married Ann Hall Dunlop (née Ann Byrd Hall; 1917–2000) of Washington, D.C., widow of William Laird Dunlop III (1909–1960). They met at the inauguration of John F. Kennedy, and divorced in December 1972 in Los Angeles.

On May 18, 1981, O'Connell died of Alzheimer's disease at the Motion Picture Country House and Hospital in the Woodland Hills section of Los Angeles. He was interred at Calvary Cemetery, Queens, New York.

Filmography

References

External links

 Arthur O'Connell Papers, Loyola Marymount University
 
 
 
 

1908 births
1981 deaths
American male stage actors
American male film actors
American male television actors
Burials at Calvary Cemetery (Queens)
Deaths from dementia in California
Deaths from Alzheimer's disease
Male actors from New York City
Male actors from Los Angeles
20th-century American male actors